{{DISPLAYTITLE:C17H24O3}}
The molecular formula C17H24O3 may refer to:

 Cyclandelate, a vasodilator
 Onchidal, a naturally occurring neurotoxin
 Shogaols, pungent constituents of ginger

Molecular formulas